Edward Hinton was an Anglican priest in Ireland during the second half of the 17th century.

He was born in County Kilkenny and educated at Merton College, Oxford. He was  Archdeacon of Cashel from 1693 until his death in 1703.

Notes

Alumni of Merton College, Oxford
Archdeacons of Cashel
18th-century Irish Anglican priests
17th-century Irish Anglican priests
Year of birth missing
1703 deaths